Donkey is a Croatian drama film directed by Antonio Nuić. It was released in 2009. It was successful at the Pula Film Festival.

Cast
Nebojša Glogovac as Boro
Nataša Janjić as Jasna
Ljubo Kapor as Ante (as Ljubomir Kiki Kapor)
Asja Jovanović as Tetka
Tonko Lonza as Pasko
Emir Hadžihafizbegović as Petar
Roko Roglić as Luka
Trpimir Jurkić as Iko
Gordana Boban as Danica

Reception
The film won three Golden Arena awards at the 2009 Pula Film Festival, as well as the Oktavijan Award of the Croatian Society of Film Critics for the best film of the year.

References

External links
 

2009 films
2000s Croatian-language films
2009 drama films
Films set in 1995
Croatian drama films
Yugoslav Wars films